Selma Sól Magnúsdóttir (born 23 April 1998) is an Icelandic footballer who plays as a midfielder for Rosenborg and has appeared for the Iceland women's national team.

Career
Magnúsdóttir has been capped for the Iceland national team, appearing for the team during the 2019 FIFA Women's World Cup qualifying cycle.

International goals

References

External links
 
 
 

1998 births
Living people
Selma Sol Magnusdottir
Selma Sol Magnusdottir
Women's association football midfielders
Selma Sol Magnusdottir
UEFA Women's Euro 2022 players